Stepan Ivanovich Oganesyan; (born 28 September 2001) is a Russian football player of Armenian descent. He plays as a winger or centre-forward for FC Orenburg on loan from FC Spartak Moscow.

Club career
He made his debut in the Russian Football National League for FC Spartak-2 Moscow on 9 March 2020 in a game against FC Tekstilshchik Ivanovo. He started and played a full game.

He made his Russian Premier League debut for FC Spartak Moscow on 17 October 2020 in a 3–2 away victory over FC Khimki, substituting Aleksandr Kokorin in the 80th minute.

On 29 June 2022, Oganesyan joined FC Orenburg on loan with an option to buy.

Career statistics

References

External links
 Profile by Russian Football National League
 
 
 

2001 births
Sportspeople from Kemerovo Oblast
People from Mezhdurechensk, Kemerovo Oblast
Russian people of Armenian descent
Living people
Russian footballers
Russia youth international footballers
Russia under-21 international footballers
Association football midfielders
FC Spartak-2 Moscow players
FC Spartak Moscow players
FC Orenburg players
Russian Premier League players
Russian First League players